Mark Slade is an actor.

Mark Slade may also refer to:

Mark Slade (fencer)